Fresen is a surname. Notable people with the surname include:

 Erik Fresen, (born 1976), American politician
 Patricia Fresen (born 1940), South African theologian

See also 
 Fresen., standard author abbreviation for Georg Fresenius (1808–1866), German physician and botanist
 Fresens, a municipality in Neuchâtel, Switzerland